Tipp City is a city in Miami County, Ohio, United States, just outside Dayton. The population was 9,689 at the 2010 census. Originally known as Tippecanoe, and then Tippecanoe City, it was renamed to Tipp City in 1938 because another town in Ohio was likewise named Tippecanoe. The city lies in the Miami Valley and sits along Interstate 75 near the Interstate 70 interchange.

Tipp City is part of the Dayton Metropolitan Statistical Area.

Geography 
Tipp City is located on the Miami River, approximately 10 miles north of Dayton and has direct highway access to Interstate 75.  (39.963876, -84.183704).

Demographics

2010 census 
As of the census of 2010, there were 9,689 people, 3,861 households, and 2,685 families residing in the city. The racial makeup of the city was 95.9% White, 0.6% African American, 0.2% Native American, 1.5% Asian, 0.7% from other races, and 1.2% from two or more races. Hispanic or Latino of any race were 1.6% of the population.

There were 3,861 households, of which 35.5% had children under the age of 18 living with them, 54.3% were married couples living together, 11.0% had a female householder with no husband present, 4.2% had a male householder with no wife present, and 30.5% were non-families. 27.0% of all households were made up of individuals, and 11.7% had someone living alone who was 65 years of age or older. The average household size was 2.48 and the average family size was 3.01.

The median age in the city was 40.3 years. 25.9% of residents were under the age of 18; 7% were between the ages of 18 and 24; 24.2% were from 25 to 44; 27.9% were from 45 to 64; and 15% were 65 years of age or older. The gender makeup of the city was 48.2% male and 51.8% female.

2000 census 
As of the census of 2000, there were 9,221 people, 3,632 households, and 2,542 families residing in the city. The population density was 1,492.6 people per square mile (576.1/km). There were 3,799 housing units at an average density of 615.0 per square mile (237.3/km). The racial makeup of the city was 97.54% White, 0.25% African American, 0.23% Native American, 0.90% Asian, 0.39% from other races, and 0.69% from two or more races. Hispanic or Latino of any race were 1.20% of the population.

There were 3,632 households, out of which 36.9% had children under the age of 18 living with them, 56.6% were married couples living together, 9.6% had a female householder with no husband present, and 30.0% were non-families. 25.1% of all households were made up of individuals, and 10.7% had someone living alone who was 65 years of age or older. The average household size was 2.51 and the average family size was 3.02.

In the city the population was spread out, with 28.2% under the age of 18, 7.7% from 18 to 24, 30.1% from 25 to 44, 21.1% from 45 to 64, and 13.0% who were 65 years of age or older. The median age was 36 years. For every 100 females, there were 93.9 males. For every 100 females age 18 and over, there were 89.9 males.

The median income for a household in the city was $48,675, and the median income for a family was $62,991. Males had a median income of $44,917 versus $27,973 for females. The per capita income for the city was $24,118. About 3.8% of families and 5.2% of the population were below the poverty line, including 6.5% of those under age 18 and 2.4% of those age 65 or over.

History 

Tippecanoe City was founded in 1840 along the developing Miami and Erie Canal. Its name derives from Presidential candidate William Henry Harrison's nickname, Tippecanoe, which, in turn, was derived from his heroism at the Battle of Tippecanoe, November 7, 1811.

The early city was a popular stopping-off point for boatmen traveling along the Miami and Erie Canal. The original downtown purportedly included a large number of bars and a red light district. The now dry canal locks can be seen just east of downtown. As Tippecanoe City grew, it merged with Hyattsville, a contiguous village, located on present-day Hyatt Street.

Development of the railroads in the 1850s and 1860s put the canals out of business and slowed the city's initially rapid growth. Ruins of a repair shop (yard barn) for the old Inter-Urban rail system can still be seen on the outskirts of town.

The development of U.S. Route 25 (County Road 25-A) and subsequently Interstate 75 brought construction and vibrance back to the town throughout the 20th century.

History of city name 
The dramatic modern growth of the town has occurred under a new name: Tipp City. The US Postal Service abbreviated the town's name in the 1930s to resolve a conflict with Tippecanoe, Ohio. Some local controversy exists as to whether the name can or should revert to the former Tippecanoe City.

Proponents of the change argue that ZIP codes obviate the conflict. Tipp City and Tippecanoe are 200 miles apart. Tippecanoe is too small for many Ohio maps and is not even one of the 10 incorporated municipalities of Harrison County. The sparsely populated Harrison County is the 5th smallest of Ohio's 88 counties. Downtown Tipp City businesses that wish to play up the Tippecanoe City 19th century heritage have argued that modern geography and postal methods would alleviate any confusion in reverting to the old name.

On the other hand, residents are used to the name Tipp City. Addresses and signage would have to be changed if renaming were sought. While the city's name was changed long ago, the high school never changed its name; Tippecanoe High School, is a constant reminder to people in the area of what "Tipp" refers to. Currently, the issue does not seem to matter enough to most residents to prompt political action.

Tipp City Tornado 
On June 8th, 2022, a tornado struck Tipp City, causing heavy damage to a Meijer distribution center in the area. The tornado strengthened just before hitting the city. This tornado traveled 13.9 miles before ending in Casstown, Ohio. This and 5 other tornadoes were part of a tornado outbreak in Ohio, which had 6 tornadoes strike the state.

Economics 
Tipp City functions as a bedroom community north of Dayton, and includes light manufacturing, small business and family-owned restaurants, serving the local community and travelers along I-75.

Government 
Tipp City uses the council-manager government system. In this system, the mayor is the ceremonial head, selected by the council from among its members. The Council President is likewise selected and presides over each council meeting. The council chooses a City Manager, who holds administrative authority over the city government. Council members are selected on a nonpartisan, at-large ballot.

Education 
Tipp City Exempted Village Schools serve the city proper and surrounding Monroe Township. The buildings are located on three campuses and serve Kindergarten through 12th grade. The MVCTC provides vocational training to secondary students. While Bethel Local Schools has a Tipp City mailing address, the school is not affiliated with Tipp City Exempted Village Schools in any form, and serves students from parts of Tipp City, Huber Heights and Bethel Township.
 Nevin Coppock Elementary School, Grades K-1
 Broadway Elementary School, Grades 2-3
 L.T. Ball Intermediate School, Grades 4–5
 Tippecanoe Middle School, Grades 6–8
 Tippecanoe High School, Grades 9–12
Bethel Local School District 
 Bethel Elementary School Grades K-5
 Bethel Middle School Grades 6-8
 Bethel High School, Grades 9-12

Parks and recreation 
Staffed by four full-time employees, the Parks Division is responsible for the maintenance of City Park and Kyle Park as well as eight neighborhood parks and the Nature Center. Park facilities include tennis courts, basketball courts, swimming pool, athletic fields, picnic shelters, playground equipment, nature trails, driving range, batting cages, community canoe livery and boat ramp on the Great Miami River. City Park also is home to a historic structure called the "Roundhouse," a favorite spot for family picnics and reunions. Tipp-Monroe Community Services hosts a summer playground at the Roundhouse for eight weeks, while organizations such as the Mum Festival Committee utilize the facility for their annual events.

Tipp City Bike Trail 
Currently finished, and was under construction, the Miami County Bike Trail will be Tipp City's addition to the Buckeye Trail. The Miami County Bike Trail will be a north–south paved trail that will stretch the length of Miami County, allowing bikers, hikers and hitchhikers to follow the path of the Great Miami River and Miami and Erie Canal. Starting at the Shelby county line, it will run through the south end of Piqua, Troy and Tipp City before meeting up with the Miami County Municipal Jail just south of Tipp City. The Tipp City portion of the trail will consist of three sections:
 The first stage, which was completed in July 2005, runs from Main Street at the Canal Lock Park, north past the new Aquatic Center, west of the baseball fields, then meanders along the river before ending at the Nature Center on North Third Street.
 A second segment will run north from the Nature Center to the southern end of the Troy Trail, which currently ends about 1/2 mile north of Tipp-Cowlesville Road. This portion of the trail is funded and construction is set to begin in 2007. Monroe Township is the sponsor for this trail section, and the lead agency is Five Rivers Metroparks. The part of uncompleted trail wrapped up construction in the Autumn of 2008 with the Trail partnership with Miami County Park District. The 1/2 mile connector to the Troy Trail was dedicated on October 30, 2008 by local sub political jurisdictions attending the ceremonial ribbon-cutting. Media: KIT-channel 5, Tipp City Independent Voice
 A third segment, due to begin construction in 2007–2008, will run south from Main Street, connect with the existing bike trail in Kyle Park, and run south along the eastern side of Canal Road before connecting with the Montgomery County trail at Ross Road. There is currently a parking lot here that allows access and convenient parking to the Montgomery Trail, which runs through Huber Heights, under I-70, and south to Needmore Road. Eventually, the Montgomery Trail will lead to the Triangle Park area in northern Dayton. When these sections are completed, bikers will be able to travel all the way from Tipp City to downtown Dayton via bike path.

Culture 
The cultural focus of Tipp City is largely based on high school and community-gathering events. In the fourth week of September each year, the city, in partnership with local garden center Spring Hill Nurseries, puts on the Mum Festival, the largest community event of the year, attracting visitors from neighboring towns and cities to the parade, car cruise in and festival grounds. Other community events include Canal Days (the third weekend in May), Independence Day fireworks, Tippecanoe High School "Red Devil" football games. The Miami County Visitors Bureau as well as the Tipp City Visitor's Bureau maintains a list of upcoming special events.

In past years, Tipp City has been home to the Trans Am Nationals Friday night "cruise in" during late August

In popular culture 
"Tipp City" is the name of a song by The Amps, a band fronted by Kim Deal, who hails from nearby Huber Heights municipality. 

Tipp City was featured in a Rescue 911 Episode where a teacher had a heart attack at a high school.

Media 
Newspapers
 Weekly Record Herald (2010)
 Tippecanoe Gazette (2010)

Online news resource
 TippNews DAILY is a daily, free online news resource for residents of Tipp City. It is an internet-only publication that features citizen journalism.

Internet radio
 Get Social Radio broadcasts over the Public Internet 24/7 carrying local weather, news, sports, syndicated talk shows and music.

Public-access television
 KIT-TV Cable Channel 5 on Time Warner Cable

Media no longer in publication
 The Tipp City Independent Voice ceased publication with the final issue on July 22, 2009.
 The Tipp City Herald ceased publication in late 2008.

Presidential visit 
In response to a letter by local businessman Steve Bruns, United States President George W. Bush visited Tipp City for a speech on the Global War on Terrorism at Tippecanoe High School on April 19, 2007. The visit was the first to Tipp City by a sitting president. Donn Davis Way is thus named as George W. Bush Parkway as an honorary second designation.

References

External links 
 City website
 Tipp City Chamber of Commerce
 Tipp City Visitor's Bureau

 
Cities in Ohio
Cities in Miami County, Ohio
Populated places established in 1840
1840 establishments in Ohio